South Race Street Historic District is a national historic district located at Statesville, Iredell County, North Carolina.  It encompasses 85 contributing buildings in a planned mixed residential and commercial section of Statesville.  The district includes notable examples of Queen Anne, Colonial Revival and Bungalow / American Craftsman architecture dated between about 1894 and 1945. Notable buildings include the Western Avenue Baptist Church, Race Street Methodist Church parsonage, J.L. Kimball House (c. 1898), J.F. Scroggs House (c. 1909), J.W. Kaneer House (c. 1900), and J.G. Hallyburton House (c. 1900).

It was listed on the National Register of Historic Places in 1995.

References

Historic districts on the National Register of Historic Places in North Carolina
Queen Anne architecture in North Carolina
Colonial Revival architecture in North Carolina
Geography of Iredell County, North Carolina
National Register of Historic Places in Iredell County, North Carolina